Hun and po are types of souls in Chinese philosophy and traditional religion. Within this ancient soul dualism tradition, every living human has both a  spiritual, ethereal, yang soul which leaves the body after death, and also a  corporeal, substantive, yin soul which remains with the corpse of the deceased.

Characters

(or ) and    have the "ghost radical"   "ghost; devil" and phonetics of   "cloud; cloudy" and   "white; clear; pure".

Besides the common meaning of "a soul",   was a variant Chinese character for   "a lunar phase" and   "dregs". The Book of Documents used   as a graphic variant for   "dark aspect of the moon" – this character usually means   "overlord; hegemon". For example, "On the third month, when (the growth phase) of the moon began to wane, the duke of Chow [i.e., Duke of Zhou] commenced the foundations, and proceeded to build the new great city of Lǒ". The Zhuangzi "[Writings of] Master Zhuang" wrote   (lit. "rotten dregs") "worthless; unwanted; waste matter" with a   variant. A wheelwright sees Duke Huan of Qi with books by dead sages and says, "what you are reading there is nothing but the [] chaff and dregs of the men of old!".

In the history of Chinese writing, characters for   "lunar brightness" appeared before those for   "soul; spirit". The spiritual   and   "dual souls" are first recorded in Warring States period (475–221 BCE) seal script characters. The lunar   or  "moon's brightness" appears in both Zhou dynasty (1045–256 BCE) Bronzeware script and oracle bone script, but not in Shang dynasty (ca. 1600–1046 BCE) oracle inscriptions. The earliest form of this "lunar brightness" character was found on a (c. 11th century BCE) Zhou oracle bone inscription.

Etymologies
The  soul's etymology  is better understood than the  soul's.  Schuessler reconstructs   "'spiritual soul' which makes a human personality" and   "vegetative or animal soul ... which accounts for growth and physiological functions" as Middle Chinese γuən and pʰak from Old Chinese *wûn and *phrâk.

Etymologically, Schuessler says   "animal soul" "is the same word as"   "a lunar phase".
, the soul responsible for growth, is the same as  the waxing and waning of the moon". The meaning 'soul' has probably been transferred from the moon since men must have been aware of lunar phases long before they had developed theories on the soul. This is supported by the etymology 'bright', and by the inverted word order which can only have originated with meteorological expressions ... The association with the moon explains perhaps why the  soul is classified as Yin ... in spite of the etymology 'bright' (which should be Yang), hun's Yang classification may be due to the association with clouds and by extension sky, even though the word invokes 'dark'. 'Soul' and 'moon' are related in other cultures, by cognation or convergence, as in Tibeto-Burman and Proto-Lolo–Burmese *s/ʼ-la "moon; soul; spirit", Written Tibetan cognates bla "soul" and zla "moon", and Proto-Miao–Yao *bla "spirit; soul; moon". 

The semantics of   "white soul" probably originated with  "lunar whiteness". Zhou bronze inscriptions commonly recorded lunar phases with the terms   "after the brightness has grown" and    "after the brightness has died", which Schuessler explains as "second quarter of the lunar month" and "last quarter of the lunar month". Chinese scholars have variously interpreted these two terms as lunar quarters or fixed days, and Wang Guowei's lunar-quarter analysis the most likely. Yü translates them as "after the birth of the crescent" and "after the death of the crescent". Etymologically, lunar and spiritual  < pʰak < *phrâk  are cognate with  < bɐk < *brâk  "white". According to Hu Shih,  etymologically means "white, whiteness, and bright light"; "The primitive Chinese seem to have regarded the changing phases of the moon as periodic birth and death of its [], its 'white light' or soul." Yü says this ancient association between the  soul and the "growing light of the new moon is of tremendous importance to our understanding of certain myths related to the seventh day of the months." Two celebrated examples in Chinese mythology are Xi Wangmu and Emperor Wu meeting on the seventh day of the first lunar month and The Princess and the Cowherd or Qixi Festival held on the seventh day of the seventh lunar month.

The etymology of  < γuən < *wûn  is comparatively less certain. Hu said, "The word  is etymologically the same as the word , meaning "clouds." The clouds float about and seem more free and more active than the cold, white-lighted portion of the growing and waning moon." Schuessler cites two possibilities. Since  is the 'bright' soul,  is the 'dark' soul and therefore cognate to   'cloud', perhaps in the sense of 'shadowy' because some believe that the  soul will live after death in a world of shadows.

Semantics
The correlative "soul" words   and   have several meanings in Chinese plus many translations and explanations in English. The table below shows translation equivalents from some major Chinese-English dictionaries.

In the following examples, all Chinese-English translation equivalents are from DeFrancis.

  "soul; psyche"
  "soul; spirit"
  "(colloquial) soul; ghost"
  "soul; spirit; apparition"
  "soul; three finer spirits and several baser instincts that motivate a human being"
  "soul"

"Peering as far as one can into these ancient psycho-physiological ideas, one gains the impression that the distinction was something like that between what we would call motor and sensory activity on the one hand, and also voluntary as against vegetative processes on the other."

History

Origin of terms

Two earlier 6th century contexts used the  soul alone. Both describe   "heaven; god"   "seizing; taking away" a person's , which resulted in a loss of mental faculties. In 593 BCE (Duke Xuan 15th year), after Zhao Tong  behaved inappropriately at the Zhou court, an observer predicted: "In less than ten years [Zhao Tong] will be sure to meet with great calamity. Heaven has taken his [] wits away from him." In 543 BCE (Duke Xiang 29th year, Boyou  from the state of Zheng acted irrationally, which an official interpreted as: "Heaven is destroying [Boyou], and has taken away his [] reason." Boyou's political enemies subsequently arranged to take away his hereditary position and assassinate him.

Two later sixth-century  contexts used  together with the  soul. In 534 BCE, the ghost of Boyou  (above) was seeking revenge on his murderers, and terrifying the people of Zheng (Duke Zhao, Year &). The philosopher and statesman Zi Chan, realizing that Boyou's loss of hereditary office had caused his spirit to be deprived of sacrifices, reinstated his son to the family position, and the ghost disappeared.

Compare the translation of Needham and Lu, who interpret this as an early Chinese discourse on embryology. 

In 516 BCE (Duke Zhao, Year 20), the Duke of Song and a guest named Shusun  were both seen weeping during a supposedly joyful gathering. Yue Qi , a Song court official, said:

Hu proposed, "The idea of a  may have been a contribution from the southern peoples" (who originated  rituals) and then spread to the north sometime during the sixth century BCE.

Relation to yin-yang
"The [] intelligent spirit returns to heaven the [] body and the animal soul return to the earth; and hence arose the idea of seeking (for the deceased) in sacrifice in the unseen darkness and in the bright region above." Compare this modern translation, "The breath-soul (hun-ch'I ) returns to heaven; the bodily soul (hsing-p'o ) returns to earth. Therefore, in sacrificial-offering one should seek the meaning in the   principle." Yü summarizes / dualism.

Traditional medical beliefs
The (c. 1st century BCE)  medical text spiritually applies Wu Xing "Five Phase" theory to the  "organs", associating the  soul with liver (Chinese medicine) and blood, and the  soul with lung (Chinese medicine) and breath.

Han medical texts reveal that  and  departing from the body does not necessarily cause death but rather distress and sickness.

Burial customs
Chinese jade was believed to delay the decomposition of a body. Pieces of jade were commonly placed in bodily orifices, or rarely crafted into jade burial suits.

Separation at death
Generations of sinologists have repeatedly asserted that Han-era people commonly believed the heavenly  and earthly  souls separated at death, but recent scholarship and archeology suggest that  dualism was more an academic theory than a popular faith. Kenneth Brashier reexamined the evidence for  dualism and relegated it "to the realm of scholasticism rather than general beliefs on death." Brashier cited several Han sources (grave deeds, Book of the Later Han, and Jiaoshi Yilin) attesting beliefs that "the hun remains in the grave instead of flying up to heaven", and suggested it "was sealed into the grave to prevent its escape."

 and  souls, explains Yü, "are regarded as the very essence of the mind, the source of knowledge and intelligence.

Soon after death, it was believed that a person's  and  could be temporarily reunited through a ritual called the   "recall; return",   "summon the  soul", or   "to summon the -soul to reunite with the -soul". The earliest known account of this ritual is found in the (3rd century BCE)  poems   "Summons of the Soul" and   "The Great Summons". For example, the  Yang summons a man's soul in the "Zhao Hun".

Daoism

  and   spiritual concepts were important in several Daoist traditions. For instance, "Since the volatile  is fond of wandering and leaving the body during sleep, techniques were devised to restrain it, one of which entailed a method of staying constantly awake."

The   "three  and seven " were anthropomorphized and visualized. The "Genii" Chapter argues that the departing of these dual souls cause illness and death.
All men, wise or foolish, know that their bodies contain ethereal as well as gross breaths, and that when some of them quit the body, illness ensues; when they all leave him, a man dies. In the former case, the magicians have amulets for restraining them; in the latter case, The Rites [i.e., ] provide ceremonials for summoning them back. These breaths are most intimately bound up with us, for they are born when we are, but over a whole lifetime probably nobody actually hears or sees them. Would one conclude that they do not exist because they are neither seen nor heard? (2)

This "magicians" translates fangshi  "doctor; diviner' magician". Both  and   "Daoist priests" developed methods and rituals to summon  and  back into a person's body.

In T'ai-i's elixir for Summoning Gross and Ethereal Breaths the five minerals [i.e., cinnabar, realgar, arsenolite, malachite, and magnetite] are used and sealed with Six-One lute as in the Nine-crucible cinnabars. It is particularly effective for raising those who have died of a stroke. In cases where the corpse has been dead less than four days, force open the corpse's mouth and insert a pill of this elixir and one of sulphur, washing them down its gullet with water. The corpse will immediately come to life. In every case the resurrected remark that they have seen a messenger with a baton of authority summoning them. (4)
For visualizing the ten souls, the  "Truth on Earth" chapter recommends taking   "great medicines" and practicing a  "divide/multiply the body" multilocation technique.

My teacher used to say that to preserve Unity was to practice jointly Bright Mirror, and that on becoming successful in the mirror procedure a man would be able to multiply his body to several dozen all with the same dress and facial expression. My teacher also used to say that you should take the great medicines diligently if you wished to enjoy Fullness of Life, and that you should use metal solutions and a multiplication of your person if you wished to communicate with the gods. By multiplying the body, the three  and the seven  are automatically seen within the body, and in addition it becomes possible to meet and visit the powers of heaven and the deities of earth and to have all the gods of the mountains and rivers in one's service. (18)

In Shangqing Neidan "Internal Alchemy", Baldrian-Hussein says,
This causes the vital force to decay, especially during sexual activity, and eventually leads to death.

Number of souls
The number of human "souls" has been a long-standing source of controversy among Chinese religious traditions. Stevan Harrell concludes, "Almost every number from one to a dozen has at one time or another been proposed as the correct one." The most commonly believed numbers of "souls" in a person are one, two, three, and ten.

Harrell gives a fieldwork example.
Because the contexts are separate, there is little conflict and little need for abstract reasoning about a nonexistent problem. 
Two "souls" is a common folk belief, and reinforced by  theory.

Three "souls" comes from widespread beliefs that the soul of a dead person can exist in the multiple locations. The missionary Justus Doolittle recorded that Chinese people in Fuzhou 
Believe each person has three distinct souls while living. These souls separate at the death of the adult to whom they belong. One resides in the ancestral tablet erected to his memory, if the head of a family; another lurks in the coffin or the grave, and the third departs to the infernal regions to undergo its merited punishment. 

Ten "souls" of   "three  and seven " is not only Daoist; "Some authorities would maintain that the three-seven "soul" is basic to all Chinese religion". During the Later Han period, Daoists fixed the number of  souls at three and the number of  souls at seven. A newly deceased person may return to his home at some nights, sometimes one week after his death and the seven po would disappear one by one every 7 days after death. According to Needham and Lu, "It is a little difficult to ascertain the reason for this, since fives and sixes (if they corresponded to the viscera) would have rather been expected." Three  may stand for the   "three principles of social order: relationships between ruler-subject, father-child, and husband-wife". Seven  may stand for the   "seven apertures (in the head, eyes, ears, nostrils, and mouth)" or the   "seven emotions (joy, anger, sorrow, fear, worry, grief, fright)" in traditional Chinese medicine. Sanhunqipo also stand for other names.

See also
 Soul dualism, similar beliefs in other animism belief systems.  
 Mitama
 Ancient Egyptian beliefs about the soul, in which the soul has many parts
 , the Chinese underworld, eventually understood as a form of Hell
 Heaven, known in modern Chinese as 
 , traditional Chinese grave goods

References
 
 
 
 
 
 
 
  Review at  Oxford Academic.
 
 
 
 

Footnotes

Further reading

External links
What Is Shen (Spirit)?, Appendix: Hun and Po
The Indigenous Chinese Concepts of Hun and P'o Souls, Singapore Paranormal Investigators – link obsolete – Internet Archive copy, Singapore Paranormal Investigators – link obsolete – Internet Archive copy
, Chinese Buddhist Electronic Text Association

Chinese culture
Chinese philosophy
Concepts in Chinese folk religion
Afterlife
Spiritualism

pl:Hun (religia chińska)